The following is the final results of the Iranian Volleyball Super League (Velayat Cup) 2000/01 season.

Standings

 The match between Paykan and Neopan remains unfinished in the fifth set because of the crowd.
 Shora Shahr Tabriz withdrew from the league.

References 
 volleyball.ir

League 2000-01
Iran Super League, 2000-01
Iran Super League, 2000-01
Volleyball League, 2000-01
Volleyball League, 2000-01